Job Henry Charles Drain VC (15 October 1895 – 26 July 1975) was an English recipient of the Victoria Cross, the highest and most prestigious award for gallantry in the face of the enemy that can be awarded to British and Commonwealth forces.

Biography
Drain was born on 15 October 1895 in Barking, Essex. He was 18 years old, and a Driver in the 37th Battery, Royal Field Artillery, British Army during the First World War when the following deed took place for which he was awarded the VC.

Victoria Cross
On 26 August 1914 at Le Cateau, France, when a captain (Douglas Reynolds) of the same battery was trying to recapture two guns, Driver Drain and another driver (Frederick Luke) volunteered to help and gave great assistance in the eventual saving of one of the guns.

He later achieved the rank of Sergeant. He died on 26 July 1975.

Memorials
Drain was a resident of Barking, Essex. In autumn 2009, a statue of him was erected on Broadway, Barking. A blue heritage plaque was also erected at his last residence in Greatfields Road.

His VC is on display in the Lord Ashcroft Gallery at the Imperial War Museum, London.

References

Monuments to Courage (David Harvey, 1999)
The Register of the Victoria Cross (This England, 1997)
VCs of the First World War: 1914 (Gerald Gliddon, 1994)

External links
 Biography
Location of grave and VC medal (Essex)

1895 births
1975 deaths
People from Barking, London
Royal Artillery soldiers
British World War I recipients of the Victoria Cross
British Army personnel of World War I
British Army recipients of the Victoria Cross
Military personnel from Essex
Burials in Essex